Anneliese Dressel is best known for her weekly (on Mondays towards the end of the final hour of Paudie Palmer Sport roundup), nutrition and health slot on C103 FM. C103 FM is a radio station broadcasting from Cork, Ireland. In addition to this weekly feature, Anneliese Dressel has also made appearances on Dublin 4FM, Limerick FM, RTÉ’s Ryan Tubridy show, and BBC Northern Ireland. She is also a regular contributor to publications such as the Irish Independent, The Irish Times, and the Irish Examiner.

References

External links 
 C103 Website
 Institute of Health Sciences
 The Irish Times Article
 Irish Independent Article

Living people
Irish radio presenters
Irish women radio presenters
Year of birth missing (living people)
Nutritionists